"Don't Swallow the Cap" is a song by American indie rock band The National. Written by band members Matt Berninger, Aaron Dessner, and Bryce Dessner, it appears as the third track on the band's sixth studio album Trouble Will Find Me. "Don't Swallow the Cap" was released to United States modern rock radio as the album's second overall single on April 22, 2013.

Charts

Personnel
Credits adapted from Trouble Will Find Me liner notes.

 Matt Berninger – lead vocals
 Aaron Dessner – guitar, keyboards, vibraphone, harmonica
 Bryce Dessner – guitar, keyboards, e-bow, orchestration 
 Bryan Devendorf – drums, percussion
 Scott Devendorf – bass guitar

Release history

References

2013 singles
2013 songs
The National (band) songs
4AD singles
Songs written by Matt Berninger
Songs written by Aaron Dessner
Songs written by Bryce Dessner
Song recordings produced by Aaron Dessner
Song recordings produced by Bryce Dessner